Sutphen is a surname. Notable people with the surname include:

C.H. Sutphen, founder of Sutphen, an American emergency service vehicle manufacturing company
Jeff Sutphen (born 1977), American actor, producer, and game show host
Joyce Sutphen (born 1949), American poet
Mona Sutphen (born 1967), American government official
Van Tassel Sutphen (1861–1945), American playwright, librettist, novelist, and editor

See also
Sutphin, another surname
Sutphen, Kansas
Zutphen